The Roxy was a fashionable nightclub located at 41–43 Neal Street in London's Covent Garden, known for hosting the flowering British punk music scene in its infancy.

History
The premises had formerly been used as a warehouse to serve the Covent Garden wholesale fruit and vegetable market. In 1970 they were converted to a late-night bar called the Chaguaramas Club. At that time it was owned by record producer Tony Ashfield, who had several hits with 1970s reggae star John Holt, with whom he formed a company called Chaguaramas Recording Productions, probably after Chaguaramas Bay in Trinidad.

The Roxy was started by Andrew Czezowski, Susan Carrington and Barry Jones. The space was small, and spread out on two levels, which contained little more than a bar and a dance floor.

In December 1976, Czezowski organised three gigs at the Roxy. They financed the venture with borrowed money (Jones, a musician, pawned his guitar to stock the bars, and hire sound equipment, etc.). The first show, on 14 December, was Generation X, a band Czezowski managed. The second on the following night was the Heartbreakers. The third, on 21 December, featured Siouxsie and the Banshees and Generation X. However, it was the Clash and the Heartbreakers that headlined the official gala opening on 1 January 1977 which was filmed by Julien Temple and finally screened on BBC Four on 1 January 2015 as The Clash: New Year's Day '77.

Don Letts was the resident DJ at the club and he was instrumental in encouraging punk rockers to embrace reggae.

In 1977, Harvest Records released an album Live at the Roxy WC2, featuring some of the regular acts who performed there, that made the top 20 in the UK Albums Chart. A further live album was released in May 1978 of lesser known acts such as the UK Subs, Open Sore, Crabs and the Bears. Since the late 1980s, a number of previously unreleased recordings of Roxy gigs from the late 1970s have been released as live albums including the Buzzcocks (Trojan 1989), the Adverts (Receiver, 1990), X-Ray Spex (Receiver, 1991), and the Boys (Receiver, 1999).

DJ Letts recorded many of the band performances in 1977 at the Roxy, some of which were released the following year as The Punk Rock Movie.

The anarcho-punk band Crass featured the Roxy as the subject of one of their most well known tracks, "Banned from the Roxy", in 1978.

Site

The site later became the flagship store for the swimwear brand Speedo.

On Tuesday 25 April 2017, a 'People's Plaque' was unveiled by the Seven Dials Trust and invited unveilers - Andrew Czezowski and Susan Carrington, the founders of the ROXY (with Barry Jones), Gaye Black (The Adverts), Pauline Murray (Penetration), Tessa Pollitt (The Slits) and Jordan Mooney (who worked for Malcolm McLaren and Vivienne Westwood's Sex (boutique)/Seditionaries shop on the King's Road). The plaque is at first-floor level on Neal Street, marking the site of 'The Roxy: legendary punk club, 1976–78'. Andrew Czezowski and Susan Carrington, guests and members of the original bands who played at the club then went onto attend the PV of 'Fear & Loathing at the ROXY' an exhibition of photographs taken mainly during the club's first 100 nights, commissioned by Shaftesbury Plc and curated by artist and historian Jane Palm-Gold. The exhibition comprised the works of Derek Ridgers, Ray Stevenson, Jeremy Gibbs and Rebecca Hale and ran for 3 weeks.

Bands that played at the Roxy in its first 100 days
Aside from four bands mentioned above in connection with the December 1976 gigs and the gala opening, other bands that appeared there in the first four months of the club's life (January 1977 to April) included:

The Adverts
Alternative TV
The Boys
Buzzcocks
Chelsea
Cock Sparrer
The Cortinas
Wayne County & the Electric Chairs
The Damned
The Drones
Eater
Generation X
The Jam
The Lurkers
Masterswitch
The Models (formerly "Beastly Cads")
Johnny Moped
The Only Ones
Penetration
The Police
The Rejects
Sham 69
Siouxsie and the Banshees
Slaughter & the Dogs
The Slits
The Stranglers
Subway Sect
The Vibrators
Cherry Vanilla
Wire
X-Ray Spex
XTC

References

Sources

Further reading

 www.roxyclub.co.uk
100 Nights at The ROXY republished in 2016 a stunning photographic essay of the famous ROXY London Covent Garden   ISBN 978-0-9956129-1-4

External links
 history Stereo Society
3:AM interview with promoter Andy Czezowski (pt.1)
3:AM interview with Andy Czezowski (pt.2)
Article on history and book
czezowski-carrington interview
 https://www.gettyimages.com/photos/czezowski-carrington
The Roxy Facebook group
Roxy Club Myspace
Roxy gigography
The Roxy review

Nightclubs in London
Former buildings and structures in the London Borough of Camden
Former music venues in London
Music venues completed in 1977
1977 establishments in England
British punk music
New wave music